Manuela Manetta (born June 6, 1983 in Parma) is a professional squash player who represented Italy. She reached a career-high world ranking of World No. 25 in December 2007.

References

External links 
 
 

1983 births
Living people
Italian female squash players
Sportspeople from Parma